The 2010–11 season was the 63rd season in the existence of FC Steaua București and the club's 63rd consecutive season in the top flight of Romanian football. In addition to the domestic league, Steaua București participated in this season's edition of the Cupa României and the UEFA Europa League.

Previous season positions

Players

Squad information

|-
|colspan="12"|Players buy, sold and rebuy during the season
|-

|-
|colspan="12"|Players sold or loaned out during the season
|-

Transfers

In

Out

Statistics

Player stats

|-
|colspan="15"|Players sold or loaned out during the season
|-

Goalscorers

Key

Goal minutes

Last updated: 25 May 2011 (UTC) 
Source: FCSB

Start formations

Squad stats
{|class="wikitable" style="text-align: center;"
|-
!
!Total
!Home
!Away
!Neutral
|-
|align=left| Games played ||48 ||23 ||24 || 1
|-
|align=left| Games won    ||21 ||11 || 9 || 1
|-
|align=left| Games drawn  ||15 || 8 || 7 || 0
|-
|align=left| Games lost   ||12 || 4 || 8 || 0
|-
|align=left| Biggest win  || 5–0 vs Unirea Urziceni || 5–0 vs Unirea Urziceni || 3–0 vs FC Vaslui || 2–1 vs Dinamo București
|-
|align=left| Biggest lose    || 4–1 vs Liverpool  3–0 vs FC Brașov || 3–0 vs FC Brașov || 4–1 vs Liverpool || —
|-
|align=left| Clean sheets    ||16 || 7 || 9 || 0
|-
|align=left| Goals scored    ||60 ||37 ||21 || 2
|-
|align=left| Goals conceded  ||42 ||22 ||19 || 1
|-
|align=left| Goal difference ||+18||+15||+2 ||+1
|-
|align=left| Top scorer      || Stancu (16) || 13 || 3 || 0
|-
|align=left| Winning rate    || % || % || % || %
|-

International appearances

Notes
 Was called for Romania's game but was not used.

Competitions

Overall

Liga I

League table

Results summary

Results by round

Points by opponent

Source: FCSB

Matches

Cupa României

Results

UEFA Europa League

Play-off round

Group stage

Group K

Results

Non competitive matches

UEFA Club rankings
This is the current UEFA Club Rankings, including season 2009–10.

Notes and references

2010-11
Romanian football clubs 2010–11 season
2010–11 UEFA Europa League participants seasons